Mount McKay is a mafic sill located south of Thunder Bay, Ontario, Canada, on the Indian reserve of the Fort William First Nation. It is the highest, most northern and best known of the Nor'Wester Mountains. It formed during a period of magmatic activity associated with the large Midcontinent Rift System about 1,100 million years ago.

History

McKay is traditionally known as the "Thunder Mountain" (Animikii-wajiw in the Ojibwe language and locally written as "Anemki-waucheu"). The mountain is used by the Ojibwe for sacred ceremonies. Only with the construction of the road did non-First Nations people get access to this land.

The English name "Mount McKay", evolved from "Mackay's Mountain" and later, "McKay's Mountain", after William Mackay, a Scottish free trader who resided in the Fort William area sometime between 1821 and 1857.

Geology
It is a flat-topped hill flanked by steep cliffs on three sides.

The Rove Formation is part of the Animikie Group. The Rove sedimentary layers in the Nor'Wester Mountains are overlain by a  cap of diabase; this Logan diabase is  million years old. This diabase cap is the erosional remnant of a sill that once extended over the entire area. Most of it is covered by a thick layer of mineral soil.

Features

A small memorial commemorates Aboriginal people that fought in wars. There is a path on the eastern face of the mountain that can be used for hiking. Plants on the mountain include red and sugar maple and poison ivy (animikiibag—"thunder-leaf" in the Ojibwe language). The top of the mountain has glacial erratics and jack pines. A small grove of yellow birch grows just south of the entrance gate.

A small, unmaintained trail can be used to reach the top from the lookout via the north face, with a heavy gauge steel cable that can be used for support.  However, due to the grade and geology (mostly shale) of the face, this unsanctioned hike is considered dangerous, and is not recommended for novice hikers.

There is also somewhat of a trail on the west side of the mountain.  Shale is predominant in this area, making the western climb considerably less dangerous than the north face.

There is a notice posted on a billboard at the lookout requesting that visitors "do not climb mountain." Animikii-wajiw is considered sacred ground by the members of the Fort William First Nation, on whose traditional territory the mountain stands.

See also
 Volcanism of Eastern Canada

References

Landforms of Thunder Bay
Mountains of Ontario
Sills (geology)
Igneous petrology of Ontario
Mountains of Canada under 1000 metres